Kantilal is an Indian name and it may refer to 
 Kantilal Amrutiya, Indian politician
 Kantilal Bhuria, Indian politician
 Kantilal Ghia, Indian politician
 Kantilal Hastimal Sancheti, Orthopaedic physician
 Kantilal Jivan, Guru
 Kantilal Kanjee,  Zimbabwean cricketer
 Kantilal Mardia, Indian statistician
 Kantilal Ranchhodji Desai, Indian cricketer
 Kantilal Thakoredas Desai, former Chief Justice of the High Court of Gujarat

Hindu given names
Indian masculine given names